"Pride" is the debut single of High and Mighty Color and was released on January 26, 2005. A remixed version, titled "Pride Remix" was released on March 24, 2005.

Information

"Pride" is their most successful single in terms of sales to date and was used as the second opening theme for the anime Mobile Suit Gundam SEED Destiny. The single's first press edition included two character identification cards for characters of the anime. In 2009, the song would be used in a commercial for the game Rockman EXE Operate Shooting Star.

Remix
The single was later released as a remix single featuring various versions of the song done by artists from all ranges of Japanese music. Upon its release the single charted on the 20th spot in Oricon.

Track listing

Personnel
High and Mighty Color
 Maakii & Yuusuke — vocals
 Kazuto — guitar
 MEG — guitar
 maCKAz — bass
 SASSY — drums

Additional
 Hide2 (Norishrocks) — creative & art direction
 Ryuichi Tamura (Norishrocks) – co-art design

References

2005 debut singles
2005 songs
High and Mighty Color songs
Gundam songs
Japanese-language songs
Sony Music Entertainment Japan singles